= Serra di Castrocucco =

Mountain in Italy

Coordinates: 39°57′06″N 15°45′01″E

Highest point
- Elevation: 743 m (2,438 ft)

Geography
- Location: Basilicata, Italy
- Parent range: Southern Apennines

Serra di Castrocucco is a mountain of Basilicata, southern Italy.
